Pod People may refer to:

Pod People (Invasion of the Body Snatchers), a fictional alien species in a novel by Jack Finney and three film adaptations
The Pod People, an unrelated 1983 film
Pod People (band), an Australian doom metal band
Extra Terrestrial Visitors, 1983 French-Spanish science fiction film renamed Pod People for the U.S. market

See also
Invasion of the Pod People, a 2007 film, also unrelated to the above
Conformity